Tony Hawk's Pro Skater 4 is a 2002 skateboarding game developed by Neversoft and published by Activision under their Activision O2 label. The game was ported by different developers to various systems. It is the fourth installment in the Tony Hawk's series. The game was released in 2002 for the GameCube, PlayStation, PlayStation 2, Xbox, and Game Boy Advance. In 2003, it was published for Microsoft Windows and Mac OS X. In 2004, a Tapwave Zodiac version was released.

Gameplay

Pro Skater 4 is a departure from the previous three games' Career mode, in which the player had a set amount of time in order to find and complete goals. 4 instead featured a Career mode more similar to Free Skate mode, in which there was no time limit to explore the level, the goals are usually offered to the player to attempt by characters found in the level. This Career mode would be later seen as the Story modes of the Underground series, American Wasteland, Project 8 and Proving Ground.

The game builds on the success of the gameplay in the previous games in the series. All of the combos from the previous game make an appearance, as well as some new tricks that can be performed to better navigate parks and areas. New to the game is the spine transfer, in which the player can press the shoulder button to transfer between quarter-pipes connected back-to-back, or otherwise self-right themselves to exit quarter-pipes or prevent bailing should they fly off them. The game also features skitching, which lets skaters hang off the back of moving vehicles.

The "hidden combos" for turning some tricks into slight variations in Pro Skater 3 turned into a standard feature, albeit not as advanced as the system would turn out in the next game in the series, where it was finalized. Also included was the ability to do grind and lip extensions by tapping a direction and grind while grinding or lipping, which can also grant the player bigger combos as they can do a grind extension into a special move, for example. As with trick extensions, this would be standard in the next game in the series where it was much simpler to do. The game is also the only one in the series where the player does not have to buy tricks. Instead, the basic trick-set the player gets is allocated depending on what type of move set the player defines for their character.

The game features fifteen professional skateboarders. Additionally, the player can unlock four other playable characters; Jango Fett from Star Wars, Eddie, the ubiquitous mascot of the heavy metal band Iron Maiden, Mike Vallely, who is a professional skater and wrestler, and Daisy, a female skater visually based on and voiced by Jenna Jameson.

With broadband, a room of up to eight people can be hosted. With dial-up, a room up to three people can be hosted. Players with either connection can join any room.

Trick Attack: The goal is to get as many points as possible. Whoever has the most points at the end wins.
Graffiti: If one player does a trick on an object, that object changes color to the player's color. If another player does a bigger trick on it that is worth more points, they steal that object from other players. The one with the most tags wins.
Combo Mambo: Almost the same as Trick Attack, except the highest number of points are done in one combo.
King of the Hill: A capture the flag type of game wherein the player must hold a crown for as long as possible.
Slap: The goal of the game is to hit each other. The faster skater will knock down the other.
Free Skate: Practice.

Reception

The game received critical acclaim. IGN gave the Xbox version a 9/10, stating that "Tony Hawk 4 is by far the best skateboarding title around and head and shoulders above its 'me-too' competition". The PlayStation 2 version received the highest score from IGN, with a 9.3/10, commenting that though the graphics hadn't changed from its predecessor, the maps were much larger than in Pro Skater 3, along with praising the increased difficulty.

GameSpot named Pro Skater 4 the best Xbox game, and second-best PlayStation 2 and GameCube game, of October 2002. It later won GameSpots annual "Best Alternative Sports Game on GameCube" and "Best Alternative Sports Game on Xbox" awards, and was nominated in the "Game of the Year on GameCube" and "Best Online Game on PlayStation 2" categories.

Game Boy Advance version
GameSpot declared it the second-best Game Boy Advance game of November, behind Metroid Fusion, and a runner-up for the publication's annual "Best Sports Game on Game Boy Advance" award, which went to Tony Hawk's Pro Skater 3.

Sequel

A sequel to the game, titled Tony Hawk's Underground, followed up in 2003.

Notes

References

External links

2002 video games
Activision games
Aspyr games
Beenox games
Game Boy Advance games
GameCube games
MacOS games
Multiplayer and single-player video games
Neversoft games
Palm OS games
PlayStation (console) games
PlayStation 2 games
Skateboarding video games
Pro Skater 4
Vicarious Visions games
Video game sequels
Video games developed in Canada
Video games set in Chicago
Video games set in London
Video games set in San Francisco
Video games set in the United Kingdom
Video games set in the United States
Video games with custom soundtrack support
Windows games
Xbox games
Video games developed in the United States